Pappardelle (singular: pappardella; from the verb , "to gobble up") are large, very broad, flat pasta, similar to wide fettuccine, originating from the region of Tuscany. The fresh types are two to three centimetres (–1 inches) wide and may have fluted edges, while dried egg pappardelle have straight sides.

References

External links
 Pappardelle (slide show), Food & Wine

Cuisine of Tuscany
Wide pasta